Wilson Roy Wheeler MBE FRAOU (1905–1988), commonly referred to as W. Roy Wheeler, was an Australian postman and professional ornithologist.  He was an active bird bander and was convener of the Altona Survey Group, later part of the Victorian Ornithological Research Group. In 1965 he was awarded the Australian Natural History Medallion.  He was a member of the Royal Australasian Ornithologists Union (RAOU), President 1964–1965, and made a Fellow of the RAOU in 1971.

He was also very active in the Bird Observers Club (BOCA), serving as President (1951–1954), Honorary Secretary (1954–1971) and Honorary Treasurer (1963–1971).  In 2005 he was commemorated, on the occasion of BOCA's centenary, by the creation of a new award, the W. Roy Wheeler Medallion for Excellence in Field Ornithology.

Honours 
 1969 — awarded Member of the British Empire (MBE) for services to nature study and conservation in Victoria
1970 — elected a Fellow of the Royal Australasian Ornithologists Union

Publications

References

Robin, Libby. (2001). The Flight of the Emu: a hundred years of Australian ornithology 1901–2001. Carlton, Vic. Melbourne University Press. 
Simpson, Ken; & Weston, Mike. (2005). W. Roy Wheeler Medallion. Bird Observer 836: 3.

Australian ornithologists
1905 births
1988 deaths
20th-century Australian zoologists
Australian Members of the Order of the British Empire